Montie is a given name and surname. Notable people with the name include:

 Montie Brewer (born 1957), former president and CEO of Air Canada
 Montie Montana (1910–1998), American rodeo trick rider and trick roper, actor, stuntman and cowboy born Owen Harlen Mickel
 Montie Rissell (born 1959), American serial killer and rapist
 Irene Montie (1921–2018), American statistician

See also
 Monte (name), given name and surname
 Monti (given name)
 Monti (surname)
 Monty, given name and surname

English masculine given names
English-language masculine given names